Arthur Ellis Franklin (18 April 1857 – 24 December 1938) was a British merchant banker and senior partner of Keyser & Co.

Early life
He was the son of the merchant banker Ellis Abraham Franklin (1822-1909), and came from a prominent Anglo-Jewish family, originally Fraenkel, that arrived in England in the 18th century.

Career
Franklin was senior partner of A. Keyser & Co.

Personal life
His wife was Caroline Jacob. They had six children: Jacob Franklin; Alice Franklin, honorary secretary of the Townswomen's Guild; Cecil Arthur Franklin, chairman of the publishers Routledge; Hugh Franklin, a campaigner for women's suffrage and later Labour politician; Helen Caroline Franklin (later Bentwich), CBE, a social worker and politician; and Ellis Arthur Franklin, also a merchant banker.

References

English bankers
English Jews
1857 births
1938 deaths
Arthur Ellis